The 1996 Eurocard Open was a men's tennis tournament played on indoor carpet courts. It was the 1st edition of the Stuttgart Masters and was part of the Mercedes Super 9 of the 1996 ATP Tour. It took place at the Schleyerhalle in Stuttgart, Germany from 21 October through 27 October 1996. Sixth-seeded Boris Becker won the singles title.

Finals

Singles

 Boris Becker defeated  Pete Sampras 3–6, 6–3, 3–6, 6–3, 6–4
 It was Becker's 4th title of the year and the 63rd of his career. It was his 1st Super 9 title of the year and his 5th overall.

Doubles

 Sébastien Lareau /  Alex O'Brien defeated  Jacco Eltingh /  Paul Haarhuis 3–6, 6–4, 6–3
 It was Lareau's only title of the year and the 3rd of his career. It was O'Brien's 2nd title of the year and the 3rd of his career.

See also
 Agassi–Sampras rivalry

Notes

References